Novato Advance is a weekly newspaper in Novato, California.

The Novato Advance has been published since July 1, 1922. Its first editor was William Hanen. Subsequent owners include Scripps Enterprises. It is now owned by Marinscope Community Newspapers, a private company dedicated to the revitalization of community newspapers, who acquired it from Scripps in 2008. It is owned and operated by veteran newsman Sherman R. Frederick.

The papers owned by Marinscope include the Novato Advance, the Sausalito Marin Scope, the San Rafael News Pointer, the Mill Valley Herald, the Twin Cities Times (Larkspur & Corte Madera) and the Ross Valley Reporter. It is a combination of paid-circulation and free doorstep delivery, totalling a circulation of ~14,000 in Marin County.

Websites are located here https://novatoadvance-ca.newsmemory.com/ here http://pacificatribune.ca.newsmemory.com/ and here http://www.marinscope.com/novato_advance/front/

References

Weekly newspapers published in California
Novato, California
Companies based in Marin County, California
Mass media in Marin County, California